Don Carlos, officially the Municipality of Don Carlos, is a 1st class municipality in the province of Bukidnon, Philippines. According to the 2020 census, it has a population of 69,273 people.

History
The first people who settled this place before was a certain Datu Andarol, his wife Ba-e Mahanu, and their son Datu ‘Mangginayun’. Datu Andarol was a ruler and the leader of the Manobo tribe settling the village of Minduso, which was the old name of Don Carlos. The place was covered with forests and access by outlanders was prohibited unless permitted by the datu. Minduso was the home of Datu Andarol's descendants. Upon the arrival of the Spaniards, the datu was succeeded by his son, Datu Mangginayun. With their contacts with the Spaniards and missionaries, Spanish naming conventions and Christianity was introduced, and Datu Mangginayun adopted the name "Antonio", hence his full name was now Datu ‘Mangginayun’ Antonio Sagandilan Sr.  He was married to Ba-e Antonina Manlayuan. His leadership reflects that of his father, as he implemented tribal laws and settled criminal offenses, particularly murder. As the leader of his tribal community, he also presided wedding ceremonies and settled dowries.

The first popular Spanish stranger who approached Datu ‘Mangginayun’ Antonio Sr. was Tomás Sandoval. He requested a parcel of land that he intend to borrow and to till, the datu conceded to his request. As part of the agreement, Tomás was to give the part of his harvest as a share to the datu. Several years later, another Spaniard by the name of "Elizalde" came and, like Tomás, requested the datu for lands to establish ranches. The lands lent by the datu to Elizalde were: lands in Pantil-pantilan, Migtutugop, the lands along the Mulita river, the today-famous Squash Mountain, and the Tugas Falls. As the agricultural ventures of these two Spaniards flourished, Cebuanos (referred by the Lumads, or natives, as "Dumagats") and other Spaniards who came from Cagayan de Misamis and other coastal towns of Misamis were encouraged to settle and populate the area that comprises the present-day Don Carlos.

Census registry for the settlers of Minduso was only located at Ramag (Manobo for ‘breakfast’), which has a fully established local government facilities and would later be known as Maramag. Antonio Sr.'s son, Datu ‘Mangginayun’ Antonio Sagandilan Jr. was born on March 17, 1917, at Miuvan (now Barangay Sinangguyan) and had his birth registered at Maramag. Antonio Jr. was drafted into the USAFFE before World War II and completed his training with the rank of corporal. However, he was called upon to fight on the outbreak of war, and his family did nothing about it.

When the war ended, Antonio Jr. succeeded his father in the leadership of his tribe as a datu in 1946. He was first a tribal councilor, and later became a barangay captain of the whole of Minduso. During his time of service, Señora Remedios ‘Meding’ Fortich de Ozamis personally visited Antonio Jr. and she petitioned the name change of Miuvan (which is now Barangay Sinangguyan) to ‘Don Carlos’ in his husband's memory, Don Carlos Azcona Fortich, and as a gratitude for living in the land which the Sagandilans flourished. At first, the datu declined, as the flourishing enclave has significance for their patrimony. Eventually, under Republic Act No. 4800, Minduso and other neighboring villages and barangays were clustered to form the municipality of Don Carlos in 1966.

Geography

Don Carlos is situated in the southern part of the province. The town is bounded by the municipalities of Maramag in the north, Kitaotao in the south, Quezon in the east, Pangantucan and Kadingilan in the west. The town is known for its famous landmark, Lake Pinamaloy.

Soil type
There are 3 types of soil that cover the municipality. These soils, which are generally clay, are Kidapawan Clay, Adtuyon Clay and Macolod Clay.

Topography
The terrain of the municipality of Don Carlos is generally flat except the mountain range on the eastern part of the municipality.

Slope
Flat to gently sloping areas ranging in slope from 0-8% is the most prevalent terrain in the municipality, which covers 198.96 km2 (93.09%) of the total land area of the municipality. Moderately sloping to undulating lands ranging in slope from 8-18% occupies approximately 7.65 km2. Rolling to moderately steep lands, sloping from 18 to 30%, covers 4.19 km2 of land. Areas with slope above 30% covers 2920.09 km2.

Climate
The municipality's climate falls under the third type. Climate under this type experiences rainy season in the months of April to September.

Barangays
Don Carlos is politically subdivided into 29 barangays.

Demographics

Economy

Commerce and trade
Commercial activities in the municipality of Don Carlos pass through a network of various commercial establishments that scatter all over the municipality. Sari-sari stores dominate these establishments with heavy concentration in barangay centers, especially in barangay Don Carlos Sur.

Based on CY 2000 records of the Municipal Treasurer's Office (MTO), the municipality of Don Carlos had a total of 350 commercial establishments, majority of these commercial establishments are engaged in retailing, merchandising, food and beverage, catering and servicing.

Agriculture
Don Carlos is an agricultural municipality. It is endowed with vast tracts of fertile agricultural lands coupled with a favorable climate. Many people in the area are greatly dependent on the produce of the land. Being the main source of income of the municipality, agriculture utilizes about 149.5894 km2 of land, representing 70% of the total land area of the municipality for the production of various crops.

In terms of production, in the year 1998, rice yielded 3,156.60 metric tons both in irrigated and rainfed farms. White and yellow corn production accounted to 39,086.10 metric tons covering 66.98 km2 representing 11.78% to agricultural area. sugarcane production as second major crop next to corn, covers a physical area of 50 km2 representing 33.42% with a total production of 21,000 metric tons.

The cash crops include leafy green vegetables, fruits, legumes and root crops. Coconut, sugarcane, banana, jackfruit, cacao and rubber comprise the commercial crops. Commercial crops cover 24.4194 km2 and has a total production 2,523.75 metric tons.

Tourism
The Municipality of Don Carlos is naturally endowed with sites which have been seen with strong potentials to be tourist destinations. These are the uncommercialized Lake Pinamaloy in Barangay Pinamaloy; the Sinangguyan and Kahulugan Waterfalls in Barangay Sinangguyan; and the Linking Caves and Spring in Barangay San Antonio East.

Lake Pinamaloy Lake Pinamaloy also known as Tourism Lake has an approximate area of 0.6 km2. It is considered as a landmark and tourist attraction, thus a development plan has been prepared and was submitted to the Department of Tourism as a blueprint of the program.

Sinangguyan and Kahulugan Falls Combined to the other tourism sites of the municipality is the Sinangguyan and Kahulugan falls, which both have the approximate height of 20 to 25 meters.

Linking Caves and Spring Located in San Antonio East, the Linking Caves and Spring adds tourism boost to the place. Reason enough that a proposal has been made to develop its nature into a swimming pool.

Evidently, these sites are enriched with innate natural physical features. Private sector and government efforts would be done to explore these potentials with extensive promotions in order to draw investors and encourage development and tourists.

Transportation

Airport
Don Carlos will be the site of the proposed Bukidnon Domestic Airport which will be located at the unused former Maraymaray Airstrip in the municipality's Barangay Maraymaray. The sequestered airstrip was previously owned by the Cojuancos. The Bukidnon Airport Development Project was included in the Department of Transportation's budget for 2018. Funds for the construction and improvement of all road networks leading to the proposed airport have been allocated by the DPWH. Construction of the domestic airport was scheduled in 2018. It will be the fourth domestic airport operating in Northern Mindanao following Laguindingan Airport in Misamis Oriental, Labo Airport in Ozamiz City and Camiguin Airport in Camiguin. Groundbreaking of the said airport was done in May 2018.

References

External links
 
 [ Philippine Standard Geographic Code]
Philippine Census Information

Municipalities of Bukidnon
Populated places on the Rio Grande de Mindanao